() is a honorary title for certain Chinese deities worshipped by Chinese folk religion devotees and Taoists in Taiwan, especially within the Fuji Traditions. It is mainly dedicated for Lord Guan or Guansheng Dijun, but also dedicated for several other deities like Chunyang Zushi or Siming Zhenjun. Most Enzhugong's temples are usually dedicated to three or five deities, however there are also temples dedicated to more deities including Lord Guan.

References 

Chinese gods
Chinese mythology
Taoism
Religion in Taiwan
Religion in China